Tara Kelly Bourne (born 17 July 2003) is an English professional footballer who plays as a defender who play for Birmingham City in the Women's Championship, on loan from Women's Super League club Manchester United. She has been capped internationally for England at youth level.

Club career
Bourne moved from the Liverpool U21 academy to join the Manchester United U21 academy during the 2019–20 season. She made her senior debut from United in April 2021 in an FA Cup fourth round tie against third-tier Burnley, entering as a 59th-minute substitute during the 6–0 win. She signed her first professional contract with the club in August 2021 and was sent out on a season-long loan with Sheffield United of the Championship. She made 12 appearances in all competitions for Sheffield United before the loan was terminated early in January and Bourne joined fellow Championship side Blackburn Rovers for the remainder of the 2021–22 season. In August 2022, Bourne joined newly relegated Championship side Birmingham City on loan for the 2022–23 season.

International career
Internationally, Bourne made three appearances for England under-19 during 2022 UEFA Women's Under-19 Championship qualification and was named to the squad for the final tournament, making a further three appearances at 2022 UEFA Women's Under-19 Championship. In August 2022, she was named to the England under-23 squad to play in a friendly against Norway.

Career statistics

Club

References

Living people
2003 births
English women's footballers
Women's association football defenders
Women's Super League players
Manchester United W.F.C. players
Sheffield United W.F.C. players
Blackburn Rovers L.F.C. players
Birmingham City W.F.C. players
England women's youth international footballers